In mathematical set theory, the axiom of adjunction states that for any two sets x, y there is a set w = x ∪ {y} given by "adjoining" the set y to the set x. It is stated as

 introduced the axiom of adjunction as one of the axioms for a system of set theory that he introduced in about 1929.
It is a weak axiom, used in some weak systems of set theory such as general set theory or finitary set theory. The adjunction operation is also used as one of the operations of primitive recursive set functions.

Interpretability of arithmetic 
Tarski and Szmielew showed that Robinson arithmetic can be interpreted in a weak set theory whose axioms are extensionality, the existence of the empty set, and the axiom of adjunction .
In fact, empty set and adjunction alone (without extensionality) suffice to interpret . (They are mutually interpretable.)

Adding epsilon-induction to empty set and adjunction yields a theory that is mutually interpretable with Peano arithmetic.
Another axiom schema also yields a theory that is mutually interpretable with :
, 
where  is not allowed to have  free.

References

 Tarski, A., and Givant, Steven (1987) A Formalization of Set Theory without Variables. Providence RI: AMS Colloquium Publications, v. 41.

Axioms of set theory